The Tower Theatre is a historic movie theatre located in Bend, Oregon, United States.

History 

The Tower Theatre opened in 1940. Initially, the seating capacity of the theatre was 998 on two levels.

In order to provide a wide range of movies, four studios were contracted to provide material: Columbia, RKO, Monogram and Warner Bros. In 1948, the theatre began to host fashion shows, variety shows, an amateur hour and ballet.

The theatre was closed in 1993 due to competition from new multiplex movie theaters.

Initial plans called for a conversion into retail and office use. A first grass-roots effort was started by local individuals and the theatre put on nearly 100 shows from 1994–1996. In 1995, the City of Bend purchased the theatre, but failing to invest in renovations, had to close it down again in 1996.

In the fall of 1996, a second attempt to save the theatre was made. A group of 30 local people gathered feedback from the community and formed a board. In 1997, they approached the City of Bend for a purchase option. Their request was met with a challenge from the city to generate $300,000 of cash and in-kind pledges of support for the project.
In July 1997, the Tower Theatre Foundation was founded as a non-profit, 501(c)(3) organization. Only a few weeks after the challenge by the city, the foundation had raised cash and in-kind pledges of $362,590.
In 1999 a campaign called "Encore! The Return of the Tower Theatre" was launched to raise further funds. It showed later that a total of $4.2 million would be needed to restore the Tower.
In 2001, the foundation purchased the Tower from the City of Bend.

Construction began in 2002. The interior space was to be expanded from : the basement was enlarged to accommodate an orchestra pit, new box seats were obtained, and the lobby area was expanded. Many local businesses pledged support by providing material, labor, and other resources in exchange for being recognized on plaques in the lobby area. A concession stand selling snacks and beverages (including beer and wine) was included in the design.

The Tower Theatre re-opened its doors in January 2004. The Tower features state-of-the-art sound and lighting equipment, a video projection system and a 35 mm film projection system. It is in full operation and features a wide variety of live acts, movie screenings, presentations and functions such as weddings. For most events, volunteers work as ushers and ticket takers. Depending on the performance, beer and wine can be purchased in the lobby and in some cases even taken inside the theatre.

References

External links 

1940 establishments in Oregon
Buildings and structures in Bend, Oregon
Culture of Bend, Oregon
Theatres in Oregon
Tourist attractions in Bend, Oregon
Theatres completed in 1940